Ellen E. Blom (born 30 November 1979) is a Norwegian ski mountaineer.

Blom was born in Bodø. She lives in Oslo, and works at the Norwegian Directorate for Health and Social Affairs.

Selected results 
 2007:
 5th, European Championship relay race (together with Lene Pedersen and Bodil Ryste)
 7th, European Championship team race (together with Lene Pedersen)
 2008:
 4th, World Championship relay race (together with Lene Pedersen, Bodil Ryste and Marit Tveite Bystøl)

External links 
 Ellen Blom at Skimountaineering.org

References 

1979 births
Living people
Norwegian female ski mountaineers
Sportspeople from Bodø